NCSY (formerly known as the National Conference of Synagogue Youth) is a Jewish youth group under the auspices of the Orthodox Union. Its operations include Jewish-inspired after-school programs; summer programs in Israel, Europe, and the United States; weekend programming, shabbatons, retreats, and regionals; Israel advocacy training; and disaster relief missions known as chesed (kindness) trips. NCSY also has an alumni organization on campuses across North America. Over the past several decades, NCSY has been the subject of two child sexual abuse scandals involving chapter advisors and directors. NCSY, and its parent organization, the Orthodox Union, say that they have taken significant steps to address such abuse from an organizational standpoint.

History 
In 1959, NCSY hired Rabbi Pinchas Stolper as the first National Director in the United States.

During the social upheavals of the 1960s and 1970s, the Orthodox youth of NCSY opposed social change, choosing instead to emphasize religious tradition.  In this period, at least one NCSY chapter took public action on this point, passing a resolution rejecting marijuana and other drugs as a violation of Jewish law. At the 1971 NCSY international convention, delegates passed resolutions in this vein, calling for members to "forge a social revolution with Torah principles."

According to the Orthodox sociologist Chaim Waxman, there has been an increase in Haredi influence on NCSY since 2012. Waxman based this on NCSY's own sociological self-study.

See also
 Orthodox Union, the sponsoring organization of NCSY
 KEDMA, an Orthodox college outreach group
 United Synagogue Youth, the youth group of Conservative Judaism
 National Federation of Temple Youth, the youth movement of Reform Judaism
 Young Judaea, the pluralist Zionist youth movement of Hadassah
 BBYO, the leading non-denominational Jewish youth movement
 Bnei Akiva
 Pinchas Stolper
 Aryeh Kaplan

References

External links
National Conference of Synagogue Youth Official website
 

Jewish youth organizations
Modern Orthodox Judaism in the United States
Youth conferences
Orthodox Jewish outreach
Youth organizations based in the United States